Michael or Mike Carter may refer to:

People

Arts, entertainment, and media
Michael Carter (actor) (born 1947), Scottish film actor
Michael Carter (musician), country music guitarist and songwriter
Michael Carter (poet), American poet and publisher
Michael A. Carter (died 2004), British sound engineer

Politics
Michael Carter (politician) (died 1954), Irish Farmers' Party politician for Leitrim Sligo in 1927
Mike Carter (politician) (1953–2021), American politician

Sports

Gridiron football
Michael Carter (running back) (born 1999), American football running back
Michael Carter (nose tackle) (born 1960), American football player and track & field athlete
Michael Carter (Canadian football) (born 1986), Canadian football defensive back
Michael Carter II (born 1999), American football safety 
Mike Carter (American football) (born 1948), American football wide receiver

Other sports
Michael Carter (boxer) (born 1949), British Olympic boxer
Michael Carter (cyclist) (born 1963), American cyclist
Michael Carter (footballer, born 1960), English football winger
Michael Carter (footballer, born 1980), English football forward
 Mike Carter (basketball) (born 1955), American-Israeli basketball player
Michael Carter-Williams (born 1991), American basketball player

Other people
Michael Carter (entrepreneur) (born 1985), tech entrepreneur and computer programmer
Michael G. Carter (born 1939), linguist

Fictional characters
Michael Jon Carter, secret identity of DC Comics superhero Booster Gold
Mike Carter (Home and Away), a fictional character on the Australian soap opera

See also
Mick Carter, character from EastEnders
Dwayne Michael Carter Jr. or Lil Wayne (born 1982), American hip hop recording artist